Elizabeth Butler, Duchess of Ormond and 2nd Baroness Dingwall (née Preston; 1615–1684) reunited the Ormond estate as her maternal grandfather, Black Tom, 10th Earl of Ormond had it, by marrying James Butler, later Duke of Ormond, her second cousin once removed (see Family tree). She had inherited her share of the Ormond estate through her mother, Elizabeth Preston, who was Black Tom's daughter and only surviving child. Her husband had inherited his share from his grandfather Walter Butler, 11th Earl of Ormond, Black Tom's successor in the earldom. Her share was the bigger one and included Kilkenny Castle.

Birth and origins 
Elizabeth was born on 25 July 1615. She was the only child of Richard Preston and Elizabeth Butler. Her father had been a younger son of the Prestons of Whitehill, Scottish gentry of the Edinburgh area. He was a page at the Scottish court and became a favourite of James VI of Scotland, who made him a groom of his bedchamber and ennobled him by creating him Lord Dingwall in 1609.

Elizabeth's mother was the only surviving child of Thomas Butler, 10th Earl of Ormond, called Black Tom. She had been married before to her first cousin Theobald Butler, 1st Viscount Butler of Tulleophelim, who had died childless in 1613. Her family was Old English and descended from Theobald Walter, who had been appointed Chief Butler of Ireland by King Henry II in 1177.

Elizabeth's parents were both Protestant. They had married in 1614, not long before her maternal grandfather's death on 22 November 1614.

Black Tom's succession and inheritance 
Her parents' lives were overshadowed by the problems of Elizabeth's maternal grandfather's succession and inheritance. Black Tom, had settled most of his estate on his male heir, his nephew Walter, who succeeded him as Earl of Ormond in 1614, according to the normal rules of succession of his title. However, Black Tom was a Protestant, whereas his nephew Walter, called "of the rosary beads", was a devout Catholic. King James I considered this a setback for his Irish politics. He intervened to keep the Ormond lands in Protestant hands. He decided that most of the estate should go to Black Tom's only child, Elizabeth. The King furthermore ordained that this daughter should marry his favourite Richard Preston, 1st Lord Dingwall, a Scottish Protestant. Accordingly, Elizabeth's parents married in 1614 as said before.

Father's succession 
Elizabeth was a single child. Her mother was about 30 at her birth and Elizabeth was her first child. Her father was about 35. He had married late and as a former favourite of James I, he was probably a homosexual. Very soon her potential to become a rich heiress was recognised and marriage plans were made. Marquess of Buckingham wanted to marry Elizabeth, aged 3, to his nephew George Feilding. As a favour for her father, Buckingham arranged that the King advanced her father to Earl of Desmond in the peerage of Ireland in 1619. However this project was abandoned.

In 1628 Elizabeth Preston, aged 13, only child, became a rich heiress when both her parents died in quick succession. First, on 10 October, her mother died in Wales and was buried in Westminster Abbey, then on 28 October her father drowned during a passage between Dublin and Holyhead. His title as Earl of Desmond became extinct, but Elizabeth inherited his Scottish title of Lord Dingwall to become Baroness Dingwall suo jure as the title had been created for her father with remainder to heirs and assigns whatsoever. As the only child Elizabeth inherited all her parents' part of the Ormond estate, which included Kilkenny Castle and the County Palatine of Tipperary. As she was a minor, she became a ward of the crown. Henry Rich, 1st Earl of Holland (1590–1649) was appointed her guardian.

Marriage and children 
At Christmas 1629, aged 14, she married her second cousin once removed, James Butler. The common ancestor was James Butler, 9th Earl of Ormond, who was her great grandfather and his great-great grandfather (see Family tree). The marriage made her Viscountess Thurles as he was at the time styled Viscount Thurles, which was the courtesy title of the heir apparent of the earls of Ormond. In 1630 the couple went to live at Carrick-on-Suir.

 
Elizabeth and James had at least ten children, but only five survived into adulthood:
Thomas (1634–1680), predeceased his father, but had a son who would become the 2nd Duke
Richard (1639–1686), became the first and last Earl of Arran of the 1662 creation and predeceased his father
Elizabeth (1640–1665), married Philip Stanhope, 2nd Earl of Chesterfield and had affairs with James Hamilton and the Duke of York
John (1643–1677), became the Earl of Gowran
Mary (1646–1710), married William Cavendish, 1st Duke of Devonshire

As a consequence of the marriage, the Ormond estate, as her grandfather, the 10th Earl, had owned it, was reunited. Elizabeth and James went to live in Kilkenny Castle, while her grandfather-in-law, the 11th Earl resided at Ormonde Castle at Carrick-on-Suir where he died on 24 February 1633. Elizabeth became Countess of Ormond as her husband succeeded to the earldom. In 1634 her eldest son, Thomas was born in Kilkenny Castle.

Irish wars 
On the outbreak of the Irish Rebellion of 1641, while her husband took command of the king's army in Dublin, she was living at Carrick-on-Suir where she was soon surrounded by the insurgents. She later moved to Kilkenny Castle and continued to stay there even when Kilkenny became the capital of the Catholic Confederation. She sheltered Protestant refugees and kept them in the castle.

She became Marchioness of Ormond on her husband's promotion on 30 August 1642. In that same year she was allowed to rejoin her husband in Dublin. Their last two children, John and Mary, were born in Dublin while they stayed there together. In the city she continued to help refugees. When the city appeared to be menaced by a siege by the Confederates after Owen Roe O'Neill's victory in the Battle of Benburb in June 1646, she also helped to reinforce Dublin's defences.

She accompanied her husband to England in 1647 after he surrendered Dublin to the parliamentary forces. As in 1648 he renewed his support for the royalist cause, Lady Ormond moved to Caen, France, where she arrived on 23 June 1648 with all her five children. From September 1648 to December 1650 her husband was again in Ireland where he tried to reunite the Irish in the fight against the Parliamentarians. The family was short of money. In 1652, Lady Ormond and her children returned to England to plead with Cromwell for income from the land she owned. She managed to obtain a pension of £2000 per year under the condition that she would not correspond with her husband.

In 1653 while in Dublin she helped her husband's brother-in-law, the Viscount Muskerry who stood accused of the murder of Protestant refugees in 1642. The went to see Chief Justice Lowther who gave her legal advice for Muskerry. This helped him to convince the court of his innocence and he was acquitted.

In 1655 she returned to Ireland accompanied by her younger children and lived at her home in Dunmore, County Kilkenny.

Restoration, later life, death, and timeline 
Following the restoration of Charles II, Lady Ormond sent her husband political information from Ireland, and the couple were later reunited in England. In March 1661 she became Duchess of Ormond as her husband was made a duke. In 1662 she became Vicereine of Ireland as her husband was appointed lord lieutenant of Ireland, serving until 1669 and again from 1677 to 1685. Lady Ormond hosted entertainment and spent lavishly on restoring and improving the family estates, but her personal correspondence reveals that she was concerned about the debts of her husband and sons. Her eldest son Thomas Butler, 6th Earl of Ossory, suddenly died in 1680. Her health began to decline in 1681, and she died in London on 21 July 1684. She was buried at Westminster Abbey on 24 July.

Notes and references

Notes

Citations

Sources 

 
 
 
  – 1643 to 1660
  – Marriages, baptisms and burials from about 1660 to 1875
  – D to F (for Desmond & Dingwall)
  – N to R (for Ormond)
 
 
  – England
 
 
  – 1625 to 1655
  – (for timeline)
 
  – House of Lords
 
  – Crawford to Falkland (for Dingwall)
  – 1 April 1661 to 31 December 1662
 
  – 1643 to 1685

Further reading 
  – Volume title: Irish Women's Writing and Tradition
  – (Snippet view)
 

1615 births
1684 deaths
17th-century Anglo-Irish people
Burials at Westminster Abbey
Elizabeth
British duchesses by marriage
Daughters of Irish earls
Irish nobility
Butler